Cyana pellucida is a moth of the family Erebidae. It was described by Walter Rothschild in 1936. It is found on Java in Indonesia.

References

Cyana
Moths described in 1936